Gryting is a small village in Gjerstad municipality in Agder county, Norway. The village is located along the Norwegian County Road 417 and the Sørlandsbanen railway line.

References

Villages in Agder
Gjerstad